Gommar A. DePauw (11 October 19186 May 2005) was an American traditionalist Catholic priest and founder of an organization that he called the Catholic Traditionalist Movement.

Early life 
DePauw was born in Stekene, Belgium, the son of a newspaper editor. After graduating as a Diplomate in Classical Humanities, magna cum laude, from the College of St. Nicholas, he entered the diocesan seminary of Ghent for his philosophical and theological studies.  During the Second World War he served as a combat medic with the 9th Belgian Infantry Hunters Regiment, and was taken prisoner at Dunkirk in 1940. After escaping from prison camp, he returned to his seminary studies and was ordained priest for the Diocese of Ghent in 1942. He served as a battle-field chaplain with the Belgian Underground Army and the Polish 1st Armoured Division until the end of the war.

Education and career 
For three years DePauw studied at the University of Leuven, where he earned a bachelor's degree in canon law and a licentiate in canon law, moral theology and church history.

In 1949 DePauw joined his family in the United States.  He served as an assistant priest in two New York City parishes: St. Stephen's in Manhattan and St. Clare's in The Bronx.  At the same time he pursued graduate studies at The Catholic University of America in Washington, D.C. In 1953 he received a doctorate in canon law with a dissertation entitled The Educational Rights of the Church and Elementary Schools in Belgium.

From 1952 to 1963 DePauw taught canon law at Mount Saint Mary's Seminary in Emmitsburg, Maryland.  In 1955 he requested and was granted incardination from the Diocese of Ghent to the Archdiocese of Baltimore and was named academic dean of the seminary. On 9 May 1955 he became a United States citizen.  While teaching at the seminary, he contributed articles to the New Catholic Encyclopedia, the Encyclopedic Dictionary of the Bible, Homiletic and Pastoral Review, and Ephemerides Theologicae Lovanienses.

During the Second Vatican Council he was called to Rome to serve as a peritus, a theological advisor to Bishop Blaise Kurz at the Council.  At the request of the Cardinal Secretary of State, Amleto Giovanni Cicognani, Pope Paul VI made him a domestic prelate with the title Right Reverend Monsignor.

Towards the end of the Second Vatican Council DePauw came into conflict with Cardinal Lawrence Shehan, Archbishop of Baltimore, over the interpretation of the council's teachings, particularly about liturgical matters.  In January 1965 DePauw incorporated an organization called the Catholic Traditionalist Movement in New York State, purportedly with the support of Cardinal Francis Spellman, Archbishop of New York.  Shehan demanded that DePauw break with the organization.  In summer 1965 Shehan removed DePauw from teaching duties at Mount Saint Mary's Seminary and transferred him to a parish in a Baltimore suburb.  Shortly thereafter DePauw left for Rome.

On 15 November 1965 Luigi Faveri, Bishop of Tivoli in Italy, signed a document transferring DePauw's incardination from the Archdiocese of Baltimore to the Diocese of Tivoli.  Faveri said that he had taken this step at the request of Cardinal Spellman and of the Cardinal Secretary of the Holy Office, Alfredo Ottaviani.  This transfer would have allowed DePauw to continue his work with the Catholic Traditionalist Movement in New York.

In January 1966 after the attempted transfer from Baltimore to Tivoli became public, Cardinal Shehan said that the transfer was never legally completed and that DePauw was still a priest incardinated in the Archdiocese of Baltimore. In order to excardinate and incardinate, a priest must request excardination of his bishop, and it must be granted. As Cardinal Shehan was following the universal law of the Church, the Bishop of Tivoli supported Cardinal Shehan. Shehan suspended DePauw from his priestly functions. Bishop Blais Kurz, the exiled Prefect Apostolic of Yungchow in China, supported DePauw.

On 23 June 1968 DePauw established the Ave Maria Chapel in Westbury, Long Island, where he ministered until his death. He became well known among traditionalist Catholics for his Sunday radio Mass, his video and audio cassettes, and pamphlets.  He edited two magazines:  Sounds of Truth and Tradition and Quote .. Unquote.  His two best-known works are the Traditional Roman Catholic Mass and The Challenge of Peace through Strength, a critique of the American Catholic bishops' pastoral letter on war and peace, The Challenge of Peace.

DePauw died on 6 May 2005.

References

External links
 Catholic Traditionalist Movement
 Fr. Gommar Depauw's obituary
 Conciliar or Catholic, 1967 lecture by DePauw
The Educational Rights of the Church and Elementary Schools in Belgium, DePauw's book from Catholic University of America Press

1918 births
2005 deaths
American traditionalist Catholics
Belgian traditionalist Catholics
People from East Flanders
Belgian emigrants to the United States
Catholic University of America alumni
Mount St. Mary's University faculty
20th-century Belgian Roman Catholic priests
KU Leuven alumni
Participants in the Second Vatican Council
Coetus Internationalis Patrum
People from Westbury, New York
Dissident Roman Catholic theologians
Traditionalist Catholic priests
20th-century American Roman Catholic priests
Belgian military personnel of World War II
Belgian Army soldiers
Belgian resistance members
Belgian military chaplains
World War II chaplains
Belgian prisoners of war in World War II
World War II prisoners of war held by Germany
Belgian escapees
Escapees from German detention
Combat medics